William Anthony Lorick (May 25, 1941 – February 17, 2013) was a professional American football running back in the National Football League (NFL) for six seasons with the Baltimore Colts and New Orleans Saints. He played college football at Arizona State University.  He was a teammate of future Hall of Fame player Charley Taylor. He died in 2013 at the age of 71.

References

1941 births
2013 deaths
American football running backs
Arizona State Sun Devils football players
Baltimore Colts players
New Orleans Saints players
Players of American football from Los Angeles